The Chicago Wolves are a professional ice hockey team playing in the American Hockey League (AHL). They are members of the Midwest division in the Western Conference. The Wolves were founded in 1994 as an expansion team in the International Hockey League (IHL). They joined the AHL in 2001 following the league's absorption of the IHL. In twenty professional seasons Chicago has won four league championships, six conference titles, and seven division championships, while failing to qualify for the playoffs four times.

The Wolves' first title came in the 1997–98 season when they won the Turner Cup as IHL champions. Two seasons later Chicago set a franchise record for points with 114 which helped them win the Fred A. Huber Trophy as the team with the league's best record. The Wolves continued their success in the playoffs losing four total games in three series en route to their second Turner Cup. In the IHL's final season the Wolves again won the Western Conference, but lost in the finals to the Orlando Solar Bears in five games. Joining the AHL for the 2001–02 season, they became the sixth team in league history to win the Calder Cup in their first year. Chicago's second season witnessed them play 23 overtime games, with the Wolves winning an AHL single season record 11 of the contests. Additionally, 7 of the wins came on home ice, which is also a league record. They captured their second Calder Cup in 2008 after defeating the Wilkes-Barre/Scranton Penguins in the finals.

Table key

Season-by-season records

References
General
 
 
 
Specific

 

American Hockey League team seasons
Chicago Wolves